Yoo Joon-young (born 17 February 1990) is a South Korean footballer who plays as midfielder for Bucheon FC 1995 in K League Challenge.

Career
Yoo was selected by Bucheon FC in the 2013 K League draft. He made 15 appearances and scored three goals in his debut season.

References

External links 

1990 births
Living people
Association football midfielders
South Korean footballers
Bucheon FC 1995 players
Gyeongnam FC players
K League 2 players
Kyung Hee University alumni